Loy McAfee (1868 – 1941) was an American surgeon, bibliographer, editor.

Early life 
Loy McAfee was born in Paulding County, Georgia, in 1868.

Education and early career 
Loy McAfee attended Medical College of Indiana, graduating with her MD in 1904.

She worked in the medical publishing industry in New York until 1918 and served as a contract surgeon in the United States Army Medical Corps from 1918 to 1921. Dr. McAfee was one of 55 women who signed on to serve as contract surgeons during World War I. She earned a salary equivalent to that of first lieutenant, though she did not hold an official rank. She was assigned to the Office of the Surgeon General on May 17, 1918, and served as the secretary to the Board of Publication. This position was in the Library of the Surgeon General's Office, the forerunner to the National Library of Medicine. At the Library, McAfee worked as a bibliographer and compiler for the Index-Catalogue. After 1921, Dr. McAfee worked in a civilian post and continued working on similar tasks.

Dr. McAfee started working towards her law degree at the National Law School in Washington, D.C., in the 1920s, earning her LLB in 1926.

Research and publications 
Loy McAfee led the effort to document the activities of the Army Medical Department during World War I. She provided editorial direction for "The Medical Department of the United States Army in the World War", a 15-volume work completed in 1930. Several parts were reviewed in JAMA.

Dr. McAfee published "Social Medicine, Medical Economics and Miscellany " in the Journal of the American Medical Association.

Later life 
Dr. McAfee died in 1941 from complications of a stomach operation.

References 

1868 births
1941 deaths
American bibliographers
Women bibliographers
American librarians
American women librarians
American surgeons
Indiana University School of Medicine alumni
National University School of Law alumni
American women physicians